Oporów  is a village in Kutno County, Łódź Voivodeship, in central Poland. It is the seat of the gmina (administrative district) called Gmina Oporów.

The village has a population of 280.

A monastery was founded in 1453, which still has a few monks.

The castle shown in the photograph was constructed in the mid 15th century for defensive purposes.

References

Villages in Kutno County
Łódź Voivodeship (1919–1939)